Gideon Asimulike Cheyo (born 24 December 1939) is a Tanzanian politician and a Member of Parliament in the National Assembly of Tanzania. He was Minister of Lands & Human Resettlement.

References

1939 births
Living people
Members of the National Assembly (Tanzania)
Government ministers of Tanzania